The men's 5000 metres relay at the 1999 Asian Winter Games was held on February 1, 1999 at the Yongpyong Indoor Ice Rink, South Korea.

Schedule
All times are Korea Standard Time (UTC+09:00)

Results

References

Final

External links
Official website

Men Relay